Nuggets is a series of compilation albums, started by Elektra Records in 1972 and continued by Rhino Records thereafter. The series focuses primarily on relatively obscure garage and psychedelic rock songs from the 1960s, but with some hits and pop-oriented songs also included.

In 1972, Elektra released Nuggets: Original Artyfacts from the First Psychedelic Era, 1965–1968, compiled by Lenny Kaye. The later series by Rhino consists of 12 vinyl-only and three single-CD albums, all released during the 1980s. In 1998, Rhino issued a 4-CD Nuggets box set, which was essentially the original 1972 LP with 91 bonus tracks. Four more box sets and four single-CDs releases followed.

The music on Rhino's 1984–1989 Nuggets series is similar to that on Kaye's original compilation. While many of the songs on the 1980s series' 15 albums appeared on the original Nuggets double LP, others were new to the series and some eventually wound up on Rhino's 1998 box set. Although most of the music was recorded by US groups, there are some exceptions, such as the Troggs (English) and the Easybeats (Australian).

In 2012, Australian label Festival Records issued their own CD compilation titled Down Under Nuggets: Original Australian Artyfacts, 1965–1967, followed by a vinyl release the following year.

Discography

Original compilation
Nuggets: Original Artyfacts from the First Psychedelic Era, 1965–1968 (1972)

Series 1984–1989
The 15 volumes of Nuggets released by Rhino Records between 1984 and 1989:

Nuggets, Volume 1: The Hits (1984)
Nuggets, Volume 2: Punk  (1984)
Nuggets, Volume 3: Pop (1984) 
Nuggets, Volume 4: Pop, Part Two (1984)
Nuggets, Volume 5: Pop, Part Three (1985)
Nuggets, Volume 6: Punk, Part Two (1985)
Nuggets, Volume 7: Early San Francisco (1985)
Nuggets, Volume 8: The Northwest (1985)
Nuggets, Volume 9: Acid Rock (1985)
Nuggets, Volume 10: Folk Rock (1985)
Nuggets, Volume 11: Pop, Part Four (1985)
Nuggets, Volume 12: Punk, Part Three (1985)
Nuggets: A Classic Collection from the Psychedelic Sixties (1986) 
More Nuggets: Classics from the Psychedelic Sixties, Vol. 2 (1987)
Even More Nuggets: Classics from the Psychedelic Sixties, Vol. 3 (1989)

Box sets
 Nuggets: Original Artyfacts from the First Psychedelic Era, 1965–1968 (1998)
 Nuggets II: Original Artyfacts from the British Empire and Beyond, 1964–1969 (2001) 
 Children of Nuggets: Original Artyfacts from the Second Psychedelic Era, 1976–1995 (2005)
 Love Is the Song We Sing: San Francisco Nuggets 1965–1970 (2007)
 Where the Action Is! Los Angeles Nuggets: 1965–1968 (2009)

Single-disc compilations
 Hallucinations: Psychedelic Pop Nuggets from the WEA Vaults (2004)
 Come to the Sunshine: Soft Pop Nuggets from the WEA Vaults (2004)
 My Mind Goes High: Psychedelic Pop Nuggets from the WEA Vaults (2005)
 A Whole Lot of Rainbows: Soft Pop Nuggets from the WEA Vaults (2005)
 Down Under Nuggets: Original Australian Artyfacts, 1965–1967 (2012)

See also
 List of garage rock compilation albums
 Psychedelic States

References

Nuggets series albums
Compilation album series
Psychedelic rock compilation albums